Rachelle Ann Villalobos Go-Spies (born August 31, 1986) is a Filipina singer and actress. She began her career by participating in and winning several singing competitions, the first of which was in the long-running Philippine variety show Eat Bulaga! at age eleven. She rose to fame when she emerged as the Grand Champion of the reality talent search Search for a Star in 2004. She was previously managed by VIVA Artist Agency and Viva Records.  She is currently managed by Cornerstone Talent Management Center and GMA Network.

Go won the Silver Prize award for her song, "From The Start", at the Shanghai Music Festival 2005 and Best Own song, "Isang Lahi", at the Astana International Song Festival 2005 in Astana, Kazakhstan. Since then, she has headlined concerts locally and internationally, recorded seven albums, which became certified gold and double platinum records. Her song "First Burn" together with Lexi Lawson, Arianna Afsar, Julia Harriman and Shoba Narayan debuted and peaked at number 1 in iTunes U.S., making her the first pure Filipino recording artist to reach number 1 in the U.S. music chart. It also charted on Billboard digital songs chart.

Go has also performed in various hit musicals in the Philippines, London's West End and on Broadway. Her debut was in The Little Mermaid, playing the role of Ariel in 2011, for which she won a Best Actress award from Broadway World Philippine Awards; and another in 2013 for Tarzan, playing the role of Jane Porter. Go's theater career continued as she was cast in the 2014 West End revival of the hit musical Miss Saigon, for the role of Gigi Van Tranh. Following this, she was cast in the 30th anniversary staging of Les Misérables in the role of Fantine. She then made her Broadway debut reprising the role of Gigi in the Broadway revival of Miss Saigon in March 2017. Rachelle Ann Go played the role of Eliza Hamilton in the original West End production of Hamilton by Lin-Manuel Miranda.

Early life
Rachelle Ann Villalobos Go was born on August 31, 1986. She is the daughter of Oscar and Russel Villalobos-Go. She is the eldest of four children. She studied pre-school to secondary level at La Immaculada Concepcion School in Pasig. She was a choir member of the school as well. She took up the international business and entrepreneurship program at San Beda College in Manila, but due to joining the Search for a Star talent show on GMA Network, she had to drop out in order to focus more on the latter. In 2008, Go passed the University of the Philippines Open University entrance exam and enrolled.

Career

Eat Bulaga: "Birit Baby" 
She joined and won several contests. Her television debut on Eat Bulaga!, a hit noontime variety show, happened when she was just eleven. She competed in the show's contest "Birit Baby" where young aspirants belt out vocally challenging songs. She sang Céline Dion's version of "All By Myself". She lost to Loverine Fermino in this competition thus getting the 2nd runner up position.

2003–04: Search for a Star, debut album, Shanghai Music Festival 
In 2003, Go auditioned for a talent search on GMA-7, Search for a Star. She passed the auditions and made it as one of the twelve finalists. On March 13, 2004, Go was announced as the grand champion, as she sung her rendition of Mariah Carey's "Through the Rain". After the contest, she transferred to ABS-CBN. Several weeks after winning, she collaborated with Philippine rap group Salbakuta for a cover of the Laura Branigan 1980s hit "Gloria". She then released it as a CD single and it became an instant hit. Go performed the song with the group in the Malacañang Palace, in front of President Gloria Macapagal-Arroyo.

In July 2004, Go released her self-titled debut album with the singles "Love of My Life" and a remake of "Don't Cry Out Loud". It also included her own cover version of Selena's "Dreaming of You"., She was then part of the Night Of The Champions U.S. Tour alongside Sarah Geronimo and Erik Santos. She then released a duet with Christian Bautista entitled "You And Me (We Wanted It All)". She was also under the management of VIVA Entertainment Group and was part of ABS-CBN, 'The Kapamilya Network'. She was involved in variety shows such as ASAP and ASAP Fanatic when she became part of Star Magic.

During November 2004, Go represented the Philippines in Shanghai Music Festival's Asia New Singer Competition where she placed as the silver-medalist for her rendition of a Vehnee Saturno-penned song, "From the Start", which won Best Song.  This was followed by more success in the 2004 Astana Song Festival where she won a silver award and for the Best Own Country Song for her version of the song, "Isang Lahi."

2005–07: Various projects 
In November 2005, Go released her second album, I Care. At the same time, she co-hosted the second season of the reality show Search for the Star in a Million. The album reached Gold status selling 15,000 copies nationwide. The theme song included in the official soundtrack, "Perhaps Love" (Hangul: 사랑인가요, originally sung by J and Howl), was also translated into Tagalog as "Pag-ibig Nga Kaya" and performed by Christian Bautista and Rachelle Ann Go with permission from MBC. The show's finale was aired on April 10, 2007, with ABS-CBN airing the Princess Hours: The Royal Special for two days, April 11 and 12, with both Bautista and Go as hosts.

Early 2007, she released her third album entitled Obsession. Two singles were released: "Don' Say Goodbye" and "Alam ng Ating mga Puso". Also during this year, she and Christian Bautista, performed at the Aliw Theater for their You and Me Valentine Concert which was produced by ASAP Live!. They also had a world tour with the same title.

2008–09: Rachelle Ann ROCKS Live! and Falling in Love 
In April 2008, she released her fourth album under VIVA Records (also her first live album) entitled Rachelle Ann ROCKS Live!. The album reached Gold status after seven months. Her carrier single, Honestly, became an instant hit and she won the 3rd IFM Award for the Song of the Year and Favorite Female Performer.

In January 2009, she released her fifth album entitled Falling In Love under VIVA Records. It was awarded the Gold Certification by VIVA Music and PARI for outstanding sales of more than 15,000 units. Go also held a concert entitled "Rachelle Ann Go Falling In Love" at the Music Museum. Among some of the guests were Martin Nievera, Gary and Gab Valenciano, Ogie Alcasid, Richard Poon and Co-Champion, Christian Bautista.

2010–11: Transfer to GMA Network, Unbreakable, The Little Mermaid 
On April 7, 2010, Go and her manager, Veronique del Rosario-Corpus of Viva Artist Agency, signed an exclusive contract at the GMA Network Center. Rachelle's first project with the Kapuso network was the Sunday musical-variety show Party Pilipinas, where she joined fellow Viva artist Mark Bautista.

For the second half of 2011, Go released her sixth album entitled Unbreakable, with "Masasabi Mo Ba" as the first single and her own composition, "Whispered Fear" as her second single. She also appeared in the GMA 7 drama series Nita Negrita, as Amanda. She was also a mentor in Protégé: The Battle for the Big Break, a reality-based singing talent show. Go made her debut in musical theatre that year as Ariel in The Little Mermaid, for which she won a Best Actress award from Broadway World Philippine Awards.

2012–2013: RAG: Rise Against Gravity concert, Miss Saigon audition, Tarzan musical 
In 2012, Go produced a solo concert "RAG Rise Against Gravity" with special guests Regine Velasquez-Alcasid, Sarah Geronimo and Christian Bautista. It was held at the Music Museum.  She also began auditioning for a role in the then-upcoming London West End revival of Miss Saigon. She took the role Lara in the musical drama series Biritera of GMA 7.

In 2013, Go played Jane Porter in the Tarzan musical, which ran from June 14 until July 7 at Meralco Theater, Pasig. She also portrayed the role of Libulan (Diwata ng Buwan) in Indio. In June of that year, Go joined the cast of SAS (Sunday All Stars), the revamped Sunday musical variety show of GMA Network.

On August 24, 2013, Go joined the Eat Bulaga!'s Hakot Pa More segment together with John Vic De Guzman during the failure lucky hakot contestant which was suffer by a Mental Disorder.

2014: Miss Saigon, Miss Rachelle: The Send Off Concert, Les Miserables, international breakthrough 
Go was selected for a major role in the 2014 West End revival of Miss Saigon.  She played the role of the disillusioned Gigi Van Tranh at the Prince Edward Theatre in London.  Go sang one of the show's most notable songs, "The Movie In My Mind". Before flying off to London to play the role of Gigi in the restaging of the hit musical "Miss Saigon", Go held a two and a half-hour send off concert entitled Miss Rachelle: The Send Off Concert with special guests Erik Santos, Christian Bautista, Mark Bautista, Sheryn Regis, Jimmy Marquez and  Regine Velasquez-Alcasid. The concert also commemorated Go's 10th anniversary in the entertainment industry.

Go met the Oscar winning actor, Eddie Redmayne who visited Miss Saigon during the sitzprobe. Redmayne also watched the show with other stars like Samantha Barks, Elaine Paige and Gillian Lynne.

Go guested on UK-based television and radio presenter and actress Gaby Roslin's radio show on BBC together with the BRIT Award-winning classical singing group Blake. Go recorded a duet with Blake as part of the group's album released in October. The album was released in UK, Australia, Philippines Korea and South Africa.

Go, together with artists from London's West End, gathered together in a concert entitled The Philippine Dream, a benefit concert for Filipino children at the Leicester Hall in London on August 17, 2014. She delivered a performance at the said concert.

Go performed a duet with Lea Salonga for a special gala performance of the musical Miss Saigon. They sang "The Movie in My Mind", eliciting cheers and a standing ovation from the audience. The gala performance was broadcast on BBC Radio 2.

Go won the Best Featured Actress award for her role as Gigi Van Tranh in Miss Saigon at the Broadway World UK/West End Awards.

Go appeared on stage with the West End cast of Miss Saigon during a Royal Variety Performance aired via ITV, a UK commercial network. One Direction, Bette Midler, Shirley Bassey, Ed Sheeran, Demi Lovato, and Ellie Goulding also performed at the event and it was attended by Prince William, Duke of Cambridge and Kate Middleton.

Go won as Best Supporting Actress in the 2015 WhatsOnStage Awards for her performance as Gigi Van Tranh in Miss Saigon. She also performed with Eva Noblezada during the awards night. Other winners include Tom Hiddleston, Mark Gatiss, Billie Piper and David Tennant.

On February 19, 2015, Go and the rest of the stars of Miss Saigon showed off their cooking skills in a shoot for the magazine of English celebrity chef Jamie Oliver.

In March 2015, Go became the cover girl of Aura Magazine, a new Filipino magazine which showcases the Philippines and the culture of its people. The magazine is available in the United Kingdom and the team is also looking into distributing the magazine in Spain, Germany and Ireland.

Go sang the song "A Dream Is a Wish Your Heart Makes" in line with the release of the film Cinderella. Disney chose Rachelle to perform the song, saying that she embodied the values of Cinderella. The music video of "A Dream is a Wish Your Heart Makes" premiered on Disney Channel and Disney Channel Asia YouTube Channel on Saturday, March 7. She also promoted the movie in the Philippines.

It was also announced that Go had been selected as the new Fantine in the 30th anniversary staging of Les Misérables in London which started on June 15 at the Queen's Theatre, a role also previously played by fellow Filipino actress and singer Lea Salonga.

Go performed the song "I Dreamed a Dream" from Les Misérables at West End Live 2015, an outdoor presentation of songs from popular musicals at Trafalgar Square in London.

On August 2, 2015, Go together with some of the West End's biggest stars joined forces with celebrities and footballers for an event to raise money for the MAD Trust and Macmillan Cancer Support in the Les Mis V Phantom charity football match. They performed during the pre-match concert.

Go also recorded a song for GMA Pinoy TV. As a Filipina breaking ground abroad, GMA thought Rachelle was the perfect singer for the theme song. "Kapuso, Anumang Kulay ang Buhay" will be released worldwide, in line with the 10th anniversary celebration of GMA International.

Go also played the role of Fantine in the Asian tour of Les Misérables. The production opened in Manila in March 2016. The cast included Earl Carpenter and Simon Gleeson who have starred in different productions around the world.

Go joined the acclaimed songwriter Scott Alan for his two-week residency at The Hippodrome Casino. Joined by special guests Rob Houchen, Bradley Jaden, Hunter Ryan Herdlicka, Britain's Got Talent winner Collabro and AJ Rafael, Go sang Alan's extensive songbook in a night filled with heartfelt songs and the stories behind them.

Go performed with the two-time Tony Award and Grammy Award winner Patti LuPone, who played Fantine in the original West End production of Les Misérables during the 30th anniversary gala.

Go won the "Best Performance in a Long-Running West End show (Female)" category of the Broadway World UK awards. Other winners include the Hollywood star Benedict Cumberbatch and Imelda Staunton.

Rachelle Ann Go performs "I Knew You Were Waiting (For Me)" with Rob Houchen, who played Marius in London's LES MISERABLES, at the Make A Difference Trust's charity cabaret.  She was also featured in Houchen's debut EP, performing a duet of "Man's Man's Man's World".  They performed the track live at the EP's launch in Shoreditch, London.

2016–2018: Les Misérables Asian tour, DIVAS (temporary stint), Broadway, Hamilton 
For representing the Philippines in the London theater scene, Go was recognized as one of Rexona's 50 Motion Sense Pinoy Movers.

Go showcased Filipino talent at the ASEAN Tourism Forum 2016.

On January 23, 2016, Creamsilk Philippines presented Rachelle Ann Go as one of their new ambassadors at the World Trade Center, Pasay City.

Go and the other artists under Cornerstone Entertainment joined forces in a new music video.
The stars are featured in the music video for the song "Tara Tena", which aims to help give listeners the right attitude towards participating in the upcoming elections. The full music video premiered on MYX.

Go was awarded by the National Commission for Culture and the Arts through its annual Ani ng Dangal Awards in the field of Dramatic Arts.

Go portrayed the role of Gigi in the film adaptation of Miss Saigon 25th Anniversary London production produced by Mackintosh and Universal, which was screened worldwide in theaters and released via digital and DVD release. It grossed £2.03 million at the box office overtaking 2014's release of Billy Elliot the Musical Live, making it the biggest ever debut for a screening of its kind.

On March 11, 2016, Go started to wow her fellow Filipinos for her portrayal of Fantine in Les Misérables Manila at "The Theater", at Solaire. She returned to London in June of same year to continue her portrayal as Fantine at West End.

Go was featured in People Asia Magazine as one of the Filipinas who made history joining the ranks of Loida Nicolas-Lewis, Cory Aquino, Lisa Macuja, KC Concepcion, Lea Salonga, Gloria Diaz and Monique Lhuillier.

Go, together with Sarah Geronimo, was the cover of Mega Magazine for the month of June recognizing her international achievements and contribution to the new generation.

Go, together with Jaclyn Jose and Pia Wurtzbach, is a Global Pinoy Awardee for 2016 given by Mega Magazine.

In June 2016, Go became a Jollibee endorser.

Go, Fil-American Eva Noblezada and the rest of the "Les Misérables" cast gave a rousing performance during the 2016 West End Live event in London held over the weekend. Go and Noblezada started with a beautiful mash-up of "I Dreamed a Dream" and "On My Own." They play the roles of Fantine and Eponine, respectively.

Go was awarded by West End Theater the Best performance of a song for her rendition of Les Misérables' "I Dreamed a Dream".

Go was originally planned to be a member of the Filipino girl group DIVAS along with Kyla, Angeline Quinto, KZ Tandingan, Yeng Constantino, however Go left the group due to international commitments. The group's concert titled DIVAS: Live in Manila was held at the Smart Araneta Coliseum on November 11, 2016.

Go's video together with her Les Mis co-stars was featured in the official video page of Twitter. She posted a video where Go took of Noblezada and Doano doing headstands in their costumes.

Go was featured on Yes Magazine's Most Beautiful Stars 2016 edition.

On July 27, 2016, Go performed during Hillsong Conference Europe 2016 at O2 Arena in London.

In October 2016, Go played the role of Mary Magdalene in Jesus the Rock Opera at the Dominion Theatre in London.

Go, together with some of the biggest stars of London's West End, re-recorded Jacques Brel's If We Only Have Love in aid of Childline as the service celebrates its 30th anniversary. It also got its national radio play on The Graham Norton Show on BBC Radio 2.

On December 23, 2016, Go had a mall show entitled Rachelle Ann Go Live at Venice Piazza. She was also performing at Eastwood City New Year's Countdown on December 31, 2016, with American singer Phoebe Ryan and other Filipino artists.

In March 2017, Go made her Broadway debut, joining the U.S. cast of Miss Saigon in 2017. She reprised her character of bar girl Gigi from her West End performance in the Broadway revival. Go appeared in Miss Saigon with the support of Actors' Equity Association. Moreover, Go received good reviews from Variety (magazine), The Hollywood Reporter and The New York Times where she and her co-stars were featured in their newspaper.

Go won Best Featured Actress in a Musical at 2017 Theater Fans' Choice Awards for her role as Gigi. This is Go's first Broadway award. Other winners include stars like Danny DeVito, Cynthia Nixon, Ben Platt, Kevin Kline, Bette Midler, Sally Field, and many more.'

Go played the role of Elizabeth Schuyler Hamilton in the West End production of the critically acclaimed and commercially successful musical Hamilton, which debuted at the Victoria Palace Theatre in London on December 6. Her performance has received critical acclaim from major publications such as Newsweek, The Guardian and The New York Times among others. She also performed alongside the cast of the popular musical Hamilton on Sunday, April 8 during the Olivier Awards at the Royal Albert Hall in London.

2019–present: Return to Les Miserables, Homecoming concert 
Go returned to play the role of Fantine when Les Misérables opened at the newly restored Sondheim Theatre. The show opened on December 18, 2019. Principal cast members who will be joining Go include her Hamilton co-star Jon Robyns (Jean Valjean), Bradley Jaden (Javert), Gerard Carey (Thénardier), Shan Ako (Eponine), Josefina Gabrielle (Madame Thénardier), Ashley Gilmour (Enjolras), and Lily Kerhoas (Cosette).

Go performed at the 2019 World Food Prize Laureate Award Ceremony held in Iowa on October 17. She performed "Bayan Ko" and a Broadway medley of "I Dreamed a Dream," "On My Own," "The Movie in My Mind," and "Defying Gravity." She concluded her outstanding performance by singing "Rise Up" which gave her a standing ovation and a resounding applause from the audience. The ceremony was broadcast live statewide on Iowa Public Television.

Go performed the song "Come Alive" during the 30th Southeast Asian Games Opening Gala Night.The said event was attended by officials from Philippine Sports Commission, Philippine Olympic Committee, International Olympic Committee, and government officials.

Go came home to the Philippines and held a Valentine's concert at the Marriott Grand Ballroom on Valentine's Day 2020.

Personal life
In early September 2017, Go became engaged to Martin Spies, a South African-born, American-raised businessman. They married on 18 April 2018, in Boracay. The couple moved into a house in Greenwich, London in December 2019. On 21 November 2020, Go announced that she and Spies were expecting a child in 2021. On 26 March 2021, she gave birth to their son Lukas Judah Spies. In December 2022, it was announced the couple were expecting their second child.

Go is a Christian.

Concerts

In 2012, she brought her prowess as a performer in her major solo concert 'Rise Against Gravity'. And the guest list was pretty gravity-defying: OPM icon Ms. Regine Velasquez-Alcasid, pop star princess Sarah Geronimo, and Christian Bautista. Two years later, she staged her 10th year/send-off concert, "Miss Rachelle," before flying off to London for the West End revival of Miss Saigon. She was originally going to be part of the DIVAS Live in Manila, however, she backed out due to prior commitments.

International tours

Discography

Albums
Studio albums 

Live albums

Repackaged

Compilation albums

Cast recordings

Singles
On its first day of release, "First Burn" debuted at the #1 spot on iTunes US. It is also climbing the iTunes charts in United Kingdom, Canada and Australia. Rachelle Ann Go becomes the first pure Filipino artist to be a part of a #1 single on iTunes US.

Filmography

Film

Television

DVD

Theatre

Awards and nominations

International recognition 
2005

Silver Medalist (as Interpreter)- Astana Song Festival
First Prize in the Best Own Country Song "Isang Lahi" (with Vehnee Saturno) – Astana Song Festival
Silver Medalist (as Interpreter) – Shanghai Song Festival 2005
Best Song for "From The Start" – Shanghai Song Festival 2005

2014

 BroadwayWorld UK/West End Awards. She won "Best Featured Actress in a New Production of a Musical" for her portrayal of Gigi Van Tranh in the 2014 West End revival of "Miss Saigon".

2015 
 "Best Supporting Actress in a Musical" award from the 15th Annual WhatsOnStage Awards for her role as Gigi Van Tranh in the 25th Anniversary Revival of Miss Saigon – Musical.

2015
 "BroadwayWorld UK/West End Awards. "Best Performance in a Long-Running West End show (Female)" for her role as Fantine in Les Misérables.

2016
 "Best Performance Of A Song 2016" for her rendition of "I Dreamed A Dream" from Les Misérables Musical, West End Production for her role as "Fantine". Award given by the West End Frame Poll Awards.
2017
 Theater Fans' Choice Awards – "Best Featured Actress in a Musical" for her role as Gigi Van Tranh in Miss Saigon (Broadway).

2018
 Take 5 Entertainment Theatre Awards – "Best Supporting Performance in a Musical for Hamilton"
 BroadwayWorld UK Awards – "Best Actress in a New Production of a Musical" for her role as Eliza in "Hamilton"

Local recognition 
2004

 Grand Champion – Search for a Star 2004
 Paganda ng Paganda ang Boses! (Special Prize) – Search for A Star 2004
 Best Major Concert Performer 2004 – Aliw Awards Inc.
 Gold Record Award for Yo! Gloria Album

2005

 Best Female Artist – MTV Pilipinas Music Awards 2005
 Female Top Star Entertainer – National Consumer Quality 2005
 Most Promising Female Singer – "Guillermo Mendoza Memorial Foundation"
 Most Outstanding Pasigueño Awardee in 2005
 Winner- 1st ASAP Platinum Circle 2005
 Platinum Record Award for Rachelle Ann Go (Self-Titled Album)
 Double Platinum Record Award for Rachelle Ann Go (Self-Titled Album)

2006

 People's Choice for Favorite Female Artist – Awit Awards 2006
 Favorite Female Artist – First MYX Music Awards 2006
 Favorite Mellow Video for "From the Start" – First MYX Music Awards 2006
 Most Outstanding Pasigueño Awardee in 2006
 Gold Record Award for I Care Album
 Platinum Record Award for Rachelle Ann Go (Limited Edition, Repackaged, Self-Titled Album)
 POP Female Artist – 1st ASAP POP Viewers Choice Awards 2006
 POP Female Performance (for "I Care") – 1st ASAP POP Viewers Choice Awards 2006

2007

 Favorite Female Artist – MYX Music Awards 2007
 POP Female Artist – 2nd ASAP POP Viewers Choice Awards 2007
 POP Kapamilya TV Themesong "Pag-Ibig na Kaya?" (Princess Hours) by Rachelle Ann Go & Christian Bautista. – 2nd ASAP POP Viewers Choice Awards 2007
 Female Top Star Entertainer of the Year"- 26th Annual Year-end Consumers Awards and Expo 2007
 Favorite Song in a duet "Pag-Ibig Na Kaya?" with Christian Bautista – 1st OPM Songhits Awards

2008

 Best Mellow Video "Alam ng Ating Mga Puso" – Myx Music Awards 2008
 Best Collaboration with Christian Bautista "Pag-ibig Na Kaya?" – Myx Music Awards 2008
 Gold Record Award for Rachelle Ann Rocks Live Album
 ASAP'08 24K Gold Record Awardee for Rachelle Ann Rocks Live Album
 ASAP'08 24K Gold Record Awardee for "GV 25: An All-Star Tribute"

2009

 3rd iFM Pinoy Music Awards Best Song by a Female Performer: "Honestly"
 3rd iFM Pinoy Music Awards Song of the Year: "Honestly"
 Revival Album of the Year, 1st PMPC Star Awards for Music[12]
 Female Star of the Night, 1st PMPC Star Awards for Music
 Pop Female Performance in a Music Video – 2009 ASAP POP Viewers' Choice Awards
 Pop Female Artist – 2009 ASAP POP Viewers' Choice Awards
 Best RnB for "Paano" – 22nd Awit Awards (PARI)
 Gold Record Award for Rachelle Ann Falling In Love Album
 ASAP'09 24K Gold Record Awardee for Rachelle Ann Falling In Love Album
 ASAP Platinum Circle Compilation Awardee 2009 "GV 25: An All-Star Tribute"
 MAXIM's 25 Hottest Women In Music – #8 spot

2012

 1st Most Liked Awards Most Liked Diva: Party Pilipinas
 Best Actress (Musical) 2012 Broadway World Philippine Awards: Disney's The Little Mermaid Theatrical

2013

 1st Sunday All Stars Awards = Stand Out Singer = (winner)

2016

 NCCA's Ani ng Dangal Awards in the Field of Dramatic Arts
 Global Pinoy Awardee by Mega magazine
 Global Pinoy Mover by Rexona
 Pinoy Pride awardee by Jollibee
 Best Actress (Musical) 2016 Broadway World Philippine Awards: Les Misérables

2020

 East Wood Star Walk of Fame Inductee for Theater Entertainment

References

External links
 

Living people
1986 births
21st-century Filipino actresses
Filipino Christians
Filipino people of Chinese descent
Filipino evangelicals
Filipino emigrants to England
Filipino expatriates in the United Kingdom
Filipino film actresses
Filipino female models
Filipino women pop singers
Filipino musical theatre actresses
Filipino Protestants
Participants in Philippine reality television series
Reality show winners
San Beda University alumni
Singers from Metro Manila
People from Pasig
University of the Philippines Open University alumni
Viva Records (Philippines) artists
Viva Artists Agency
GMA Network personalities
ABS-CBN personalities